The 2014 Pacific-Asia Curling Championships were held from November 8 to 15 at the Karuizawa Ice Park in Karuizawa, Japan.

The top two finishers in the men's tournament, Japan and China, earned berths to the 2015 Ford World Men's Curling Championship in Halifax, Nova Scotia, Canada, while the top finisher in the women's tournament, China, will join hosts Japan at the 2015 World Women's Curling Championship in Sapporo, Japan.

Men

Teams
The teams are listed as follows:

Round-robin standings

Chinese Taipei were eliminated from the tiebreaker based on the draw shot challenge results.

Round-robin results
All draw times listed in Japan Standard Time (UTC+9).

Draw 3
Monday, November 10, 9:00

Draw 4
Monday, November 10, 15:00

Draw 5
Tuesday, November 11, 9:00

Draw 6
Tuesday, November 11, 15:00

Draw 7
Wednesday, November 12, 9:00

Draw 8
Wednesday, November 12, 15:00

Draw 9
Thursday, November 13, 9:00

Tiebreaker
Thursday, November 13, 19:00

Playoffs

Semifinals
Game 2
Friday, November 14, 9:00

Game 3
Friday, November 14, 14:00

Bronze-medal game
Saturday, November 15, 14:00

Gold-medal game
Saturday, November 15, 14:00

Women

Teams
The teams are listed as follows:

Round-robin standings
Final round-robin standings

Round-robin results
All draw times listed in Japan Standard Time (UTC+9).

Draw 1
Sunday, November 9, 9:00

Draw 2
Sunday, November 9, 16:00

Draw 3
Monday, November 10, 9:00

Draw 4
Monday, November 10, 15:00

Draw 5
Tuesday, November 11, 9:00

Draw 6
Tuesday, November 11, 15:00

Draw 7
Wednesday, November 12, 9:00

Draw 8
Wednesday, November 12, 15:00

Draw 9
Thursday, November 13, 9:00

Draw 10
Thursday, November 13, 14:00

Tiebreaker
Thursday, November 13, 19:00

Playoffs

Semifinals
Game 3
Friday, November 14, 9:00

Game 4
Friday, November 14, 14:00

Bronze-medal game
Saturday, November 15, 9:00

Gold-medal game
Saturday, November 15, 9:00

References

External links

2014
2014 in curling
2014 in Japanese sport
November 2014 sports events in Asia
International curling competitions hosted by Japan
Sport in Nagano Prefecture